Kirstie is an American television sitcom starring Kirstie Alley that aired on TV Land from December 4, 2013, to February 26, 2014. TV Land cancelled Kirstie on July 29, 2014.

Synopsis
Kirstie tells the story of Tony Award-winning actress Madison "Maddie" Banks as she navigates through life after Arlo, the son whom she gave up at birth, reappears. Arlo wishes to reconnect with his biological mother after his adoptive parents died. With her assistant, Thelma, and her driver, Frank, encouraging her, Maddie decides it's not too late to give motherhood a try.

Cast and characters

Main cast
 Kirstie Alley as Madison "Maddie" Banks (born Brenda Kluszewski)
 Eric Petersen as Arlo Barth, Maddie's son
 Rhea Perlman as Thelma Katz, Maddie's personal secretary
 Michael Richards as Frank Baxter, Maddie's driver

Guest cast
 Gilles Marini as Michel, Maddie's first personal chef
 Xosha Roquemore as Tanya
 Richard Burgi as Tony Cameron
 Bryan Callen as Lucas Kogen
 Larry Joe Campbell as Clown
 Lucila Sola as Lucila, Maddie's second personal chef
 Tim Bagley as Robber
 Michael Dunn as Kevin
 Geoff Pierson as Hugh Winters
 Valerie Mahaffey as Victoria Winters
 Lindsey Kraft as Melissa Winters

Special guest stars
 Christopher McDonald as Jeffrey Sheppard, Maddie's Broadway co-star
 Kristin Chenoweth as Brittany Gold, the understudy for Madison Banks
 Cloris Leachman as Shirley Kluszewski, Maddie's mother
 Kathy Griffin as herself
 John Travolta as Mickey Russo
 Kristen Johnston as 'the real' Madison Banks
 George Wendt as Duke Bainbridge, Thelma's gay ex-husband
 Jason Alexander as Stanford Temple, Maddie's agent

Episodes

Hot in Cleveland crossover
A fifth-season episode of fellow TV Land original series Hot in Cleveland ("Bucket: We're Going to New York") has the women from that show visiting Kirstie character Maddie Banks, who is revealed to be the former acting school roommate of Victoria Chase (Wendie Malick).

References

External links

2010s American sitcoms
2013 American television series debuts
2014 American television series endings
English-language television shows
Television series about actors
Television shows filmed in Los Angeles
Television shows set in New York City
TV Land original programming